The 2016–17 Southeast Missouri State Redhawks men's basketball team represented Southeast Missouri State University during the 2016–17 NCAA Division I men's basketball season. The Redhawks, led by second-year head coach Rick Ray, played their home games at the Show Me Center in Cape Girardeau, Missouri as members of the West Division of the Ohio Valley Conference. They finished the season 15–18, 9–7 in OVC play to finish in second place in the West Division. They defeated Tennessee State in the first round of the OVC tournament to advance to the quarterfinals where they lost to Jacksonville State.

Previous season
The Redhawks finished the 2015–16 season 5–24, 2–14 in OVC play to finish in last place in the West Division. As a result, they failed to qualify for the OVC tournament.

Preseaon 
In a vote of Ohio Valley Conference head men’s basketball coaches and sports information directors, Southeast Missouri State was picked to finish last in the West Division of the OVC.

Roster

Schedule and results

|-
!colspan=9 style=| Exhibition

|-
!colspan=9 style=| Non-conference regular season

|-
!colspan=9 style=| Ohio Valley Conference regular season

|-
!colspan=9 style=|Ohio Valley Conference tournament

References

Southeast Missouri State Redhawks men's basketball seasons
Southeast Missouri State
Southeast Missouri State Redhawks men's basketball
Southeast Missouri State Redhawks men's basketball